The Chigorin Defense is a chess opening named for 19th-century Russian master Mikhail Chigorin. An uncommonly played defense to the Queen's Gambit, it begins with the following moves:
1. d4 d5
2. c4 Nc6

The Chigorin Defense violates several classical principles: Black does not maintain the center pawn at d5, the c-pawn is blocked, and Black must be willing to trade a bishop for a knight.

Although opening assessments change as improvements are found for each side, the Chigorin is generally considered  for Black, and it is useful as a surprise weapon against the Queen's Gambit. Alexander Morozevich is perhaps the only modern grandmaster who regularly plays the Chigorin Defense; in the 1980s, Vasily Smyslov did employ the opening against Garry Kasparov, achieving a draw. Morozevich has also published a book on the Chigorin Defense, in which he gives both a theoretical and a personal view on the opening.

The Chigorin Defense has the ECO classification D07.

Main variations
Because the Chigorin is an unusual defense, the theory of this opening is not as well developed as that for more popular openings. After 1.d4 d5 2.c4 Nc6, some of the most commonly played variations are:

3.Nc3
3...Nf6 4.cxd5 Nxd5 5.e4 Nxc3 6.bxc3 e5 7.d5 Nb8 or 7.Nf3 exd4.
3...dxc4 4.Nf3 Nf6 5.e4 Bg4 6.Be3 e6 7.Bxc4 Bb4 (pinning both of White's knights) is a position that occurs very frequently in current practice.

3.Nf3

3...Bg4 4.cxd5 Bxf3 (see first diagram)
5.gxf3 Qxd5 6.e3 and now Black has two very different, but proven ways of playing: 6...e5 7.Nc3 Bb4 and 6...e6 7.Nc3 Qh5.
5.dxc6 Bxc6 6.Nc3 and Black has now two well-established options: 6...Nf6 and 6...e6.
3...e6 is fine.

3.cxd5 Qxd5
4.e3 e5 5.Nc3 Bb4 6.Bd2 Bxc3 (see second diagram) 
7.bxc3 and now Black's main moves are 7...Nf6 and 7...Qd6.
7.Bxc3 has received considerable attention in recent years, and 7...exd4 8.Ne2 Nf6 9.Nxd4 0-0 seems to be considered Black's most reliable choice, but the  8...Bg4 is also sometimes played. 
4.Nf3

Notes

References

Further reading

Chess openings